Elections to Southend-on-Sea Borough Council for the Milton Ward took place on 21 March 2019.

Background 

The Milton by-election was called after the death of incumbent Labour councillor Julian Ware-Lane in January, who was up for re-election in 2020. The Independents in Southend, who work together under Ron Woodley, announced they would not stand a candidate in respect of Mr Ware-Lane's death.

Result 

No Green Party candidate as previous. (−5.7)

References 

By-elections in England
Southend-on-Sea Borough Council elections
Southend-on-Sea (town)
2010s in Essex
2019 elections in the United Kingdom